Curlew Island is an island of the Andaman Islands. It belongs to the North and Middle Andaman administrative district, part of the Indian union territory of Andaman and Nicobar Islands.

History
Curlew Island had a wildlife station to monitor birds, with permanent inhabitants.
The station was evacuated at the end of 2015 due to budget discontinued. 
The island is now uninhabited.

Geography
The island belongs to the Stewart Sound Group.

Administration
Politically, Curlew Island, along neighboring Stewart Sound Group, is part of Diglipur Taluk. The village was located on the northern tip of the islet.

Demographics 
The island is now uninhabited.
According to the 2011 census of India, the Island had 2 households. The effective literacy rate (i.e. the literacy rate of population excluding children aged 6 and below) is 50%.

References 

 Geological Survey of India

Cities and towns in North and Middle Andaman district
Islands of North and Middle Andaman district
Tourist attractions in the Andaman and Nicobar Islands
Uninhabited islands of India
Islands of India
Islands of the Bay of Bengal